Kashan University of Medical Sciences (KAUMS) is a  medical school of Iran. Located in the central city of Kashan, the university was established in 1986.

The university has 5 Schools and offers degrees in 23 fields including PhDs and residency degrees for post graduate applicants. The university operates 5 teaching hospitals and over 60 clinics in the city and surrounding areas.

Research centers

Trauma Research Center 
Founder and Chairman
Fakharian Esmaeil, MD

Editor-in-Chief
Fazel Mohammad Reza

Social determinants of health

Physiology Science Research Center

Autoimmune Disease Research Center

Anatomical Science Research Center

Health Information Management Research Center

Infectious Diseases Research Center

Research Center for Biochemistry and Nutrition in Metabolic Diseases

Hospitals

Shahid beheshti hospital 
The Shahid Beheshti Educational and Medical Center was initially established in 1990 by the Social Security Organization with the full assistance of the Board of Trustees of Kashan University of Medical Sciences.

On 2001 this center was included in the framework of the medical services of the Ministry of Health and Medical Education and was purchased from the Social Security Organization Shahid Beheshti Hospital was handed over to the university on2/12/2004

Now this hospital with an area of ​​about40,000 square meters located at km5 of Kashan-Ravand road provides services to residents of Kashan city and surrounding towns and villages.

Naghavi Hospital 
Naghavi Hospital is one of the oldest public hospitals in Kashan, which is covered by Kashan University of Medical Sciences

• This hospital with 7000 square meters of infrastructure was built in 1325 by the late Mr. Mohammad Sadegh Naghavi and was handed over to the Kashan Endowment and Charity Office along with a collection of endowed properties, and then in 1990 it was covered by the University of Medical Sciences.

• Also in 1381, another building in the hospital, called M.R.I building, was constructed and commissioned by health donors, and in 1384, the main building of the hospital, which was built in 1325.

Matini Hospital 
Matini Hospital was built in 1344 by the late Mr. Matini, one of Kashan's benefactors, and was put into operation in 1346. The center has general surgery, pediatrics and emergency departments to provide services to patients. After that, the eye, ear, nose and throat wards replaced the general surgery ward. In early 1990, the pediatric ward was transferred to Shahid Beheshti Hospital and this center continued to operate as a specialized eye, ear, nose and throat hospital.

Outpatient units including clinics, paraclinic (laser), audiometry, laboratory and reception, discharge and cash units were located in the basement and ground floor. The first floor was dedicated to the assembly hall and the Trauma Research Center. The Trauma Research Center was transferred to Shahid Beheshti Hospital in early 1985, and has now been replaced by a Refractive Surgery Center (LASIK) and a speech therapy unit.

This hospital, with its committed medical facilities and staff and with experience in diagnosing diseases and treating patients, has been able to provide desirable medical services to the people of Kashan and other neighboring cities.

Kargar nejad hospital 
The treating Akhavan hospital has been in use since 1955. Since 2013 the hospital was moved to a new location and new name (Kargarnejad Hospital). Now the hospital has an area of 6600 square meters on two floors.

The Psychiatric Hospital was established in1991 on the site of a hospital that was previously an internal ward and did not comply with psychiatric standards, called the Akhavan Hospital, which initially included a men's psychiatric ward with 19 beds and a women's psychiatric ward with 20 beds. A small section of 8 beds was added as a men's emergency.

From the beginning, the instability of the hospital due to the age of the  building and non-standard psychiatric hospital, made officials to consider building a new standard center.

Thus, with the encouragement of Mr. Javad Kargarnejad, the university started the project of building a 101-bed psychiatric hospital in 2005. This hospital was built next to Shahid Beheshti Hospital to be close to the General Hospital.

In November 2012, the hospital was transferred to a new center and Mr. Javad Kargarnejad Psychiatric Hospital was inaugurated in the presence of the Minister of Health and medical education.

This hospital is built on a land with an area of ​​about 6600 square meters and in two floors. The ground floor includes medical and paraclinical wards and units, and the first floor includes administrative and support units.

Shabihkhani hospital

Medical Faculty

History 
Kashan Medical School was founded in 1986. Now this college has 100 students and is headed by Dr. Ismail Fakharian.

Professors 
Abdolhossein Davodabadi
Esmaeel Fakharian 
Fariba Raygan Mohammad Reza Sharif Hamid Reza Talari

Dentistry faculty

Midwifery and nursing faculty

Health faculty

See also
Higher Education in Iran

References

External links
Official website

Medical schools in Iran
Universities in Iran
Educational institutions established in 1986
Universities in Isfahan Province
Buildings and structures in Kashan
1986 establishments in Iran